Helias is a butterfly genus.

Helias may also refer to:

People

Given name
Helias (died 326), Christian martyr and companion of Zanitas and Lazarus of Persia
Helias of Cologne (died 1040), Irish abbot and musician
Helias (Archdeacon of Meath), 12th-century Irish cleric
Helias of Saint-Saens (died 1128), Norman nobleman
Helias de Say (died 1165), Norman nobleman
Helias Doundoulakis (1923–2016), Greek American civil engineer

Surname
Ferdinand Helias (1796–1874), Roman Catholic clergyman in Missouri, US
Mark Helias (born 1950), American jazz musician
Pêr-Jakez Helias (1914–1995), Breton stage actor and writer
Peter Helias (c. 1100–after 1166), French priest and philosopher

Physics 

 Helias (stellarator)

See also
Helios (disambiguation)
Ilias (disambiguation)